Second Story is an album by The Hang Ups, released in 1999 on Restless Records. The production team of Mitch Easter and Don Dixon hadn't worked together since recording R.E.M.'s Murmur and Reckoning more than 15 years before.

Critical reception
AllMusic wrote that the band "can build a whole song out of a lugubrious piano, a folky guitar and an antiquated harpsichord, the beautiful bowing of a sonorous violin, or McCartney-esque ringing pop, and make the whole thing hang together." The Richmond Times-Dispatch wrote that the album "features a host of melodically engaging tunes from unheralded songwriter Brian Tighe." Washington City Paper wrote that the band "juice their sound with a force they used to only imply, resulting in the most jagged, Brit-poppy music of their career."

Track listing 
	Caroline –	3:10
	Second Story –	5:40
	Pretty BA –	2:59
	Parkway –	3:25
	Underneath A Tree –	4:10
	Out Of Touch –	2:51
	Long Goodbye –	4:03
       Blue Sky –	1:32
	The Queen	 – 2:42
	Maroon –	4:39
	Party –	2:31
	Epic –	5:16
	Untitled	0:57

References

1999 albums